Purtsi is a village in Elva Parish, Valga County in southern Estonia. It's located east of the end of the Väike-Emajõgi River, before it drains into the Lake Võrtsjärv. Viljandi–Rõngu road (nr 52) crosses the Väike-Emajõgi on a  bridge in between Purtsi and Pikasilla. As of 2011 Census, the village's population was 34.

References

Villages in Valga County